The 2023 División Intermedia season, named "Homenaje a Don Alejandro Dos Santos", will be the 105th season of the second-tier league of Paraguayan football and 26th under the Paraguayan División Intermedia name. The season will begin on 31 March and is scheduled to end on 9 October 2023, and the fixtures for the season were announced on 14 December 2022.

Format
16 teams will take part in the competition, which will be played under a double round-robin system with teams playing each other twice, once at home and once away for a total of 30 matches. The top two teams at the end of the season will be promoted to the Paraguayan Primera División for the 2024 season, while the bottom three teams in the relegation table at the end of the season will be relegated: teams located within 50 kilometres of Asunción are relegated to Primera División B, while teams from outside Greater Asunción and the Central Department are relegated to Primera División B Nacional.

Teams

Team changes

16 teams will compete in the season: 11 teams from the previous División Intermedia season plus the two teams relegated from Primera División in its 2022 season (Sol de América and 12 de Octubre), the top two teams from the 2022 Primera División B (Deportivo Recoleta and 24 de Setiembre (VP)) and the 2022 Primera División B Nacional champions Sportivo Carapeguá. Sportivo Trinidense and Sportivo Luqueño will not compete since they earned promotion to Primera División at the end of the previous season, nor will Guaraní (T), Sportivo Iteño, and River Plate, who were relegated at the end of the 2022 season by finishing in the bottom three places of the relegation table.

Stadia and locations

Standings

Results

Relegation
Relegation is determined at the end of the season by computing an average of the number of points earned per game over the past three seasons. The three teams with the lowest average will be relegated to Primera División B or Primera División B Nacional for the following season, depending on their geographical location.

 Source: APF

See also
2023 Paraguayan Primera División season
2023 Copa Paraguay

References

External links
División Intermedia on the APF's website

Paraguayan División Intermedia
Par
I